Leonard Elroy Frig (born October 30, 1950) is a Canadian former professional ice hockey defenceman who played 311 games in the National Hockey League. He played for the Chicago Black Hawks, Oakland Seals, Cleveland Barons, and St. Louis Blues between 1973 and 1980. The rest of his career, which lasted from 1969 to 1986, was spent in different minor leagues. He also played 1 game for the Utah Rollerbees who competed for one season in the now defunct league Roller Hockey International. He compiled 12 penalty minutes during his only game. He was born in Blairmore, Alberta but grew up in Lethbridge, Alberta.

Career statistics

Regular season and playoffs

Awards
 WCHL All-Star Team – 1971

External links
 

1950 births
Living people
Calgary Centennials players
California Golden Seals players
Canadian ice hockey defencemen
Chicago Blackhawks draft picks
Chicago Blackhawks players
Cleveland Barons (NHL) players
Dallas Black Hawks players
Ice hockey people from Alberta
Lethbridge Sugar Kings players
Oakland Seals players
St. Louis Blues players
Sportspeople from Lethbridge
Salt Lake Golden Eagles (CHL) players
Salt Lake Golden Eagles (IHL) players
Utah Rollerbees players